Parasitus is a genus of mites in the family Parasitidae, including the following species:

 Parasitus altaicus Davydova, 1978
 Parasitus americanus (Berlese, 1906)
 Parasitus amurensis (Volonikhina, 1993)
 Parasitus anomalus (Ma & Yan, 1998)
 Parasitus apodius (Hennessey & Farrier, 1989)
 Parasitus arcticus Karg, 1985
 Parasitus ascidiformis (Ma, 2003)
 Parasitus asiaticus Davydova, 1984
 Parasitus azaleensis van-Daele, 1975
 Parasitus bacoides Karg, 1998
 Parasitus baoshanensis Gu & Guo, 1997
 Parasitus berlesei (Willmann, 1935)
 Parasitus beta Oudemans & Voigts, 1904
 Parasitus bicornutus (Tseng, 1995)
 Parasitus bidigitalis Karg, 1998
 Parasitus bifiditectus (Hennessey & Farrier, 1989)
 Parasitus bifurcus (Ewing, 1913)
 Parasitus bisiculus (Tseng, 1995)
 Parasitus bispinatus Ma, 1996
 Parasitus brachychaetus Ma, 1986
 Parasitus buccalis Karg, 1978
 Parasitus burchanensis Oudemans, 1903
 Parasitus capitaneus (Athias-Henriot, 1980)
 Parasitus celer C.L.Koch, 1835
 Parasitus cervicornis van-Daele, 1975
 Parasitus chortophilus (Berlese, 1904)
 Parasitus coleoptratorum (Linnaeus, 1758)
 Parasitus comelicensis (Lombardini, 1962)
 Parasitus consanguineus Oudemans & Voigts, 1904
 Parasitus consors (Athias-Henriot, 1980)
 Parasitus convexus Davydova, 1984
 Parasitus copridis Costa, 1963
 Parasitus coprofilus Davydova, 1984
 Parasitus cordiformis (Ye, Ma & Shen, 1996)
 Parasitus crinitosimilis Davydova, 1988
 Parasitus crispus (Ma & Yan, 1998)
 Parasitus davydovae (Volonikhina, 1993)
 Parasitus denenensis van-Daele, 1975
 Parasitus digitalis Schmolzer, 1995
 Parasitus discoidalis (Athias-Henriot, 1980)
 Parasitus distinctus Berlese, 1903
 Parasitus dongbei (Ma, 1990)
 Parasitus effigialis (Athias-Henriot, 1979)
 Parasitus emeishanensis (Ma-Liming & Wang-Shenron, 1996)
 Parasitus eucervicornis (Tseng, 1995)
 Parasitus exiguus (Athias-Henriot, 1979)
 Parasitus femoralis (Athias-Henriot, 1979)
 Parasitus fimetorum (Berlese, 1903)
 Parasitus flagellispinosus (Tseng, 1995)
 Parasitus flavolimbatus (Koch, 1867)
 Parasitus formosanus (Tseng, 1995)
 Parasitus fragilis Ma, 1986
 Parasitus furcatus (Ma-Liming & Wang-Shenron, 1996)
 Parasitus gansuensis (Ma, 1987)
 Parasitus geotrupidis Makarova, 1996
 Parasitus haiyuanensis (Bai, Fang & Yin, 1995)
 Parasitus himalayanus Samsinak & Daniel, 1978
 Parasitus hortivagus (Berlese, 1903)
 Parasitus hubeiensis (Ma & Liu, 2002)
 Parasitus hyalinus (Willman, 1949)
 Parasitus imitofragilis Ma, 1990
 Parasitus inanis Karg, 1978
 Parasitus insularius (Volonikhina, 1993)
 Parasitus islandicus Sellnick, 1940
 Parasitus jamalensis Davydova, 1988
 Parasitus kempersi Oudemans, 1902
 Parasitus kraepelini (Berlese, 1905)
 Parasitus lanceolatus (Tseng, 1995)
 Parasitus latobacoides Karg, 1998
 Parasitus limulus Tseng, 1995
 Parasitus loricatus (Wankel, 1861)
 Parasitus lunariphilus Makarova, 1996
 Parasitus lunulatus (J. Müller, 1859)
 Parasitus maguliaris (Athias-Henriot, 1979)
 Parasitus magus (Kramer, 1876)
 Parasitus majusculus (Athias-Henriot, 1980)
 Parasitus mengyangchunae Ma, 1995
 Parasitus minus (Gu & Huang, 1990)
 Parasitus miratectus Gu & Bai, 1995
 Parasitus monticolus (Berlese, 1906)
 Parasitus multidenticulatus (Tseng, 1995)
 Parasitus multisetus (Gu & Huang, 1993)
 Parasitus mustelarum Oudemans, 1902
 Parasitus mycophilus Karg, 1971
 Parasitus nanus (Athias-Henriot, 1979)
 Parasitus neglectus (Berlese, 1903)
 Parasitus nikolskyi Davydova, 1981
 Parasitus ningxiaensis (Bai, Gu & Chen, 1991)
 Parasitus nolli (Karg, 1965)
 Parasitus obscurus (Athias-Henriot, 1980)
 Parasitus oligochaetus (Gu & Huang, 1993)
 Parasitus oudemansi (Berlese, 1902)
 Parasitus palmatus (Gu & Huang, 1993)
 Parasitus papei Karg, 1985
 Parasitus parvulus (Athias-Henriot, 1979)
 Parasitus pectospinosus Karg, 1998
 Parasitus pinatus (Tseng, 1995)
 Parasitus pinguis Karg, 1998
 Parasitus planicolus (Athias-Henriot, 1980)
 Parasitus plumosus (Gu & Yang, 1987)
 Parasitus pollinerus (El-Banhawy & Nasr, 1986)
 Parasitus prosapialis (Athias-Henriot, 1979)
 Parasitus provincialis (Athias-Henriot, 1980)
 Parasitus pygmaeus (Athias-Henriot, 1979)
 Parasitus qiangorlosana (Ma, 1990)
 Parasitus qinghaiensis (Gu & Yang, 1987)
 Parasitus quadrichaetus Ma & Cui, 1999
 Parasitus radialis (Ye & Ma, 1996)
 Parasitus ramiferus Karg, 2003
 Parasitus remberti (Oudemans, 1912)
 Parasitus reticulatus Berlese, 1903
 Parasitus sakhalinensis (Volonikhina, 1993)
 Parasitus scirpiculatus (Tseng, 1995)
 Parasitus sichuanensis Ma-Liming & Wang-Shenron, 1996
 Parasitus similis (Athias-Henriot, 1980)
 Parasitus simplex (Athias-Henriot, 1980)
 Parasitus sinicus (Ma, 1987)
 Parasitus solens (Athias-Henriot, 1980)
 Parasitus speculiger Athias-Henriot, 1979
 Parasitus squarrosus (Ma, 1987)
 Parasitus stenoventralis (Ma-Liming, 1997)
 Parasitus stepposus Davydova, 1984
 Parasitus subterraneus Schmolzer, 1995
 Parasitus subtropicus (Tseng, 1995)
 Parasitus tarsalis (Athias-Henriot, 1979)
 Parasitus tengkuofani Ma, 1995
 Parasitus tenoriglans (Athias-Henriot, 1980)
 Parasitus tenuipilosus (Karg, 1998)
 Parasitus tonpuensis (Tseng, 1995)
 Parasitus tridentatus (Karg & Glockemann, 1995)
 Parasitus trifidus (Ma, 1987)
 Parasitus trifurcatus (Tseng, 1995)
 Parasitus triramosus (Leitner)
 Parasitus trispinosus (Tseng, 1995)
 Parasitus trivialis (Athias-Henriot, 1979)
 Parasitus truncatus Tseng, 1995
 Parasitus turbinatus (Ma & Yin, 1999)
 Parasitus unicornutus (Ewing, 1909)
 Parasitus wangdunqingi Ma, 1995
 Parasitus wentinghuani Ma, 1996
 Parasitus womersleyi Nozza, 1964
 Parasitus xinjiangensis (Ye, Ma & Shen, 1996)
 Parasitus xiphoideus (Gu & Guo, 1997)
 Parasitus yinchuanensis (Bai, Fang-Lei & Gu, 1994)
 Parasitus zachvatkini Davydova, 1978
 Parasitus zhenningensis (Gu & Wang, 1987)
 Parasitus zschokkei (Schweizer, 1922)

References

Parasitidae